The International Standard Industrial Classification of All Economic Activities (ISIC) is a United Nations industry classification system. Wide use has been made of ISIC in classifying data according to kind of economic activity in the fields of employment and health data.

It is maintained by the United Nations Statistics Division.

ISIC classifies entities by activity. The most detailed categories are defined by combinations of activities described in statistical units, considering the relative importance of the activities included in these classes.

ISIC Rev.4 continues to use criteria such as input, output and use of the products produced, but places additional emphasis on production processes.

Revision history 

The United Nations Statistics Division has published the following revisions of the ISIC standard:
 Revision 1 - Published in 1958
 Revision 2 - Published in 1968
 Revision 3 - Published in 1989
 Revision 3.1 - Published by the United Nations in 2002
 Revision 4 - Published by the United Nations in 2008

ISIC Revision 4 broad structure 
	Agriculture, forestry and fishing
	Mining and quarrying
	Manufacturing
	Electricity, gas, steam and air conditioning supply
	Water supply; sewerage, waste management and remediation activities
	Construction
	Wholesale and retail trade; repair of motor vehicles and motorcycles
	Transportation and storage
	Accommodation and food service activities
	Information and communication
	Financial and insurance activities
	Real estate activities
	Professional, scientific and technical activities
	Administrative and support service activities
	Public administration and defence; compulsory social security
	Education
	Human health and social work activities
	Arts, entertainment and recreation
	Other service activities
	Activities of households as employers; undifferentiated goods- and services-producing activities of households for own use
	Activities of extraterritorial organizations and bodies

See also 

 Standard Industrial Classification (United States)
 Trade Map, HS products by hierarchy (International Trade Centre)
 North American Industry Classification System
 United Kingdom Standard Industrial Classification of Economic Activities
 Russian Economic Activities Classification System (OKVED) 
 Australian and New Zealand Standard Industrial Classification
 Industry Classification Benchmark
 Global Industry Classification Standard
 Statistical classification of economic activities in the European Community (NACE)
 Industry information (industry classifications)
 French classification of economic activities, named NAF code or APE code (in French)

References

Sources 
 United Nations Statistics Division: International Family of Classifications

External links 

 ISIC Revision 3.0 adaption in Investment Map statistical tool
 ISIC Revision 1
 ISIC Revision 2
 ISIC Revision 3
 ISIC Revision 3.1
 ISIC Revision 4
 ISIC at ILOSTAT

Industry classifications